Alfredo Mario Espósito Castro (20 May 1927 – 1 January 2010) was the first bishop of the Catholic Diocese of Zárate-Campana, Argentina.

Espósito Castro was ordained to the priesthood for Institute of Consecrated Life Claretians on 1 August 1954. He was named bishop by Pope Paul VI on 21 April 1976 and ordained on 4 July 1976. He resigned on 18 December 1991.

References

1927 births
2010 deaths
20th-century Roman Catholic bishops in Argentina
Roman Catholic bishops of Zárate-Campana